Mario Cecchini (25 January 1933 – 13 January 2021) was an Italian Catholic bishop.

Life
Cecchini was born in Italy and was ordained to the priesthood in 1958. He served as bishop of the Diocese of Fano-Fossombrone-Cagli-Pergola from 1986 until his resignation in 1998.

He died of COVID-19 in Senigallia during the COVID-19 pandemic in Italy.

Notes

1933 births
2021 deaths
20th-century Italian Roman Catholic bishops
Deaths from the COVID-19 pandemic in Marche